Some Kind of Life is an ITV's 1995 TV drama written by Kay Mellor and directed by Julian Jarrold, starring Jane Horrocks and Ray Stevenson, it was aired on 11 August 1996 and produced by Granada Television for the ITV Network.

Synopsis
In this drama, Alison (Jane Horrocks) is a young wife and mother whose life is turned upside down after her beloved husband, Steve (Ray Stevenson), is involved in a motorcycle crash, suffers massive head trauma, and regresses to a mental and emotional age of 5. Much of the story centres on the mundane aspects of being forced to deal with the loss of her husband as a man and the acquisition of him as a child. Time passes and things do not improve. Slowly, even Steve's closest friends begin withdrawing their support. Eventually, Alison is forced to decide whether she will continue to stick by Steve, or whether she will go on without him.

External links

British independent films
1995 films
1995 drama films
ITV television dramas
Films directed by Julian Jarrold
British drama films
Television series by ITV Studios
Television shows produced by Granada Television
1990s English-language films
1990s British films